Sumter is an unincorporated community in Sumter County, in the U.S. state of Georgia.

History
A post office called Sumter was established in 1884, and remained in operation until 1954. Like Sumter County, the community is named after Thomas Sumter, a United States Senator from South Carolina.

The Webb Family Farm in Sumter was listed on the National Register of Historic Places in 1985.

References

Unincorporated communities in Georgia (U.S. state)
Unincorporated communities in Sumter County, Georgia